edding AG is a German company that manufactures writing and marking tools such as felt-tip pens and permanent markers.

History 
edding AG was founded in 1960 in Hamburg by Carl-Wilhelm Edding and Volker Detlef Ledermann. At that time they started with a start-up capital of just 500 Deutsche Mark.
In 1965, they established the group brand planMASTER and started to sell products for planning and visual communication.
By the end of 1970, almost 100 million edding felt and fibre-tipped pens had been sold across the world. Eight years later the Group presented its first ever paint marker with an opaque color, which is suitable even on darker surfaces.
Shares have been traded on the stock exchange since 1986. In the same year, Edding Vertrieb GmbH was founded as a distribution and logistics centre for the German market. It is based in Wunstorf near Hannover to this day.
In 1992, edding founded V.D. Ledermann & Co. GmbH in Bautzen.
Since 2005, the company is headed by Per Ledermann, the son of the co-founder. In 2008, edding introduced its EcoLine. This product series includes permanent markers and board markers with at least 90% of the total plastic used being made from recycled material.

Brands and Products

edding
Edding sells paint markers of different line thickness and color. These are mostly made in Japan. Graffiti writers use "Edding" frequently for tagging.

Legamaster
Legamaster is the visual communication division of edding AG, the leading manufacturer of high-quality marking and writing instruments. 
Legamaster has been actively adapting its range to the latest communication technology trends and developments for more than 50 years.

Awards 
1995: For his enduring commitment to the environment, co-founder Volker Detlef Ledermann was honored with the B.A.U.M. award.

2000-2010: Edding 3000 and Edding 2000 permanent markers were voted best markers in the world by the Global Consumer Index.

2007: The University of St. Gallen in Switzerland lists Edding AG as one of the top 100 German employers in the small and medium-sized businesses sector.

2008: Deloitte awarded edding AG the "Axia Award 2008" (in the small and medium-sized businesses category) for its excellent strategic orientation.

See also 
List of German companies
 List of pen types, brands and companies

References

External links 
 Edding website

Ahrensburg
Writing implement manufacturers
German brands
Companies based in Schleswig-Holstein
Manufacturing companies established in 1960
Distribution companies of Germany
Manufacturing companies based in Hamburg
1960 establishments in West Germany
Office supply companies of Germany
German companies established in 1960
1980s initial public offerings